Vorobey (Воробей) is an East Slavic surname which means "sparrow". It is particularly common in Ukraine and Belarus. Alternative spellings include Vorobei, Varabei, and Vorobej. The name may refer to:

 Aleksandr Vorobey (born 1957), Soviet-Belarusian athlete
 Andriy Vorobey (born 1978), Ukrainian footballer
 Dmytro Vorobey (born 1985), Ukrainian footballer
 Elena Vorobey (born 1967), Russian actor and stand-up comedian
 Pavel Vorobey (born 1997), Belarusian ice hockey player
 Roman Vorobey (footballer, born 1994), Ukrainian footballer
 Roman Vorobey (footballer, born 1995), Ukrainian footballer

See also

Varabei, Belarusian equivalent
Vorobyov

References

Russian-language surnames
Ukrainian-language surnames
Surnames from nicknames